Air charter is the business of renting an entire aircraft (i.e., chartering) as opposed to individual aircraft seats (i.e., purchasing a ticket through a traditional airline).

Regulation
Charter – also called air taxi or ad hoc – flights require certification from the associated country's civil aviation authority. The regulations are differentiated from typical commercial/passenger service by offering a non-scheduled service.

Analogous regulations generally also apply to air ambulance and cargo operators, which are often also ad hoc for-hire services.

United States
In the U.S. these flights are regulated under FAA Part 135. There are some cases where a charter operator can sell scheduled flights, but only in limited quantities. As of 2021, the FAA had made it a priority to crack down on unauthorised charter flights, according to industry experts.

Types of service
There are several business models which offer air charter services from the traditional charter operator to brokers and jet card programs:
 Charter operators – certified by their associated government body such as the FAA for US carriers have legal authority to advertise and conduct flights for hire.
 Air charter broker – Charter brokers arrange flights on behalf of their clients, acting as "authorized agents".
 Jet card – Programs offered by both brokers and operators where a customer is offered a fixed hourly rate for a specific jet category and the broker or operator sources a jet from the available charter fleet.
 Online marketplace – Online booking platform where the client can choose and book the desired aircraft directly with the operator.

Aircraft categories
Charter aircraft categories include:
 Seaplanes – examples: DHC-2 Beaver, DHC-3 Otter
 Turbo props – examples: Pilatus PC-12, King Air 350, Piaggio P-180 Avanti
 Light jets – examples: Phenom 300, Citation CJ3
 Mid-cabin jets – examples: Learjet 60, Hawker 800XP
 Super mid-cabin jets – examples: Citation X, Challenger 300
 Large jets – examples: Bombardier Challenger 605, Falcon 900
 Ultra long-range jets – examples: Gulfstream V, Gulfstream G650, Dassault Falcon 7X
 VIP airliners – examples: Boeing Business Jet, Airbus Corporate Jets

There are an estimated 15,000 business jets available for charter in the world. The US market is the largest, followed by the European market with growing activity in the Middle East, Asia, and Central America.

See also
 Air taxi
 Commercial aviation
 List of charter airlines

References

External links

Aircraft finance
 
Vehicle rental
Airline types